Split-Dalmatia County is a central-southern Dalmatian county in Croatia. The administrative center is Split. The population of the county is 455,242 (2011). The land area is 14.106,40 km2. 
Split-Dalmatia County is Croatia's most rapidly urbanising and developing region, as economic opportunities and living standards are among the highest alongside capital Zagreb and Istria County. 

Physically, the county is divided into three main parts: an elevated hinterland (Dalmatinska zagora) with numerous karst fields; a narrow coastal strip with high population density; and the islands. Parts of the Dinaric Alps, including Dinara itself, form the border with Bosnia and Herzegovina while the Kozjak, Mosor and Biokovo mountains separate the coastal strip from the hinterland.

Important economic activities include agriculture, manufacturing and fishing, though the most important one is tourism.

Split-Dalmatia County is Croatia's biggest county by area.

The county is linked to the rest of Croatia by the newly built four-lane Split-Zadar-Karlovac-Zagreb highway and the Lika railway. Split Airport is the busiest airport in the region.

In the hinterland, the larger towns are Sinj (pop. 11,500 town, 25,373 with villages), Imotski (4,350) and Vrgorac (2,200).

Besides the largest city, Split (189,000 city proper, 250,000 including Kaštela and Solin), the towns on the coast are Trogir (11,000), Omiš (6,500) and Makarska (13,400).

On the islands, the populations are smaller due to high levels of emigration, but are still mostly urban in character. The main townships are: Supetar (3,300) on the island of Brač; Hvar town (3,700) and Stari Grad (1,900) on Hvar; and Vis town (1,800) and Komiža (1,500) on Vis.

History
The name Dalmatia comes from an Illyrian tribe called the Dalmatae who inhabited the area of the eastern Adriatic coast in the 1st millennium BC. It was part of the Illyrian kingdom from the 4th century BC until the Illyrian Wars in the 220s BC and 168 BC when the Roman Republic established its protectorate south of the river Neretva. Dalmatia as a geographical name was in use probably from the second half of the 2nd century BC for the area spanning the eastern Adriatic coast between the Krka and Neretva rivers. It was slowly incorporated into Roman possessions until the province of Illyricum was formally established c. 32–27 BC.

Dalmatia became part of the Roman province of Illyricum. In 9 AD, the Dalmatians raised the final of a series of revolts together with the Pannonians, but it was finally crushed, and in 10 AD, Illyricum was split into two provinces, Pannonia and Dalmatia which spread into larger area inland to cover all of the Dinaric Alps and most of the eastern Adriatic coast.  Dalmatia was the birthplace of the Roman Emperor Diocletian, who constructed Diocletian's Palace in the core of what is now Split.

Administrative division

Split-Dalmatia County is divided into 16 cities and 39 municipalities. Note that both cities and municipalities are administrative divisions immediately under the county, on the same level.

County government

Current Župan (prefect): Blaženko Boban (HDZ)

The county assembly is composed of 51 representatives, organized as follows:
 HDZ-HSS 22
 Croatian Democratic Union (HDZ)
 Croatian Peasant Party (HSS)
 Most 10
 The Bridge (Most)
  SDP-HNS 8
 Social Democratic Party of Croatia (SDP)
 Croatian People's Party (HNS)
 HGS 7
 Croatian Civic Party (HGS)

Demographics 

According to the 2011 census, Split-Dalmatia County has population of 454,798. Croats make up an absolute majority with 97.08% of the population.

Economy
Split-Dalmatia County has the 5th highest Human Development Index of any county in Croatia.
Before privatisation and accession to European Union, beside tourism the most notable branch was Shipbuilding.
County now relies on tourism as main source of income.

Footnotes

External links

 County web site 
 Dalmatia.iNFO - Dalmatia travel portal
 Split Dalmatia County tourist guide in English

 
Counties of Croatia